Eyitayo Jegede SAN, is a Nigerian legal practitioner and 2019 Ondo state PDP gubernatorial aspirant.

Early life and education 
Jegede was born to the family of late Chief Johnson Bosede, the Odopetu of Isinkan, Akure, and Mrs C.O Jegede (née Asokeji) from Ipele town, near Owo in Ondo State, Nigeria. He attended St. Stephen’s “SA” Primary School Modakeke, and was at Aquinas College Akure from 5 January 1973 to July 1978 for his Secondary Education. He was a Senior Prefect at Aquinas College and took active part in Sports in the best traditions of the family. He had his Higher School Certificate Education at Christ's School Ado Ekiti and was the School Volleyball Captain both at Aquinas College, Akure and Christ School, Ado Ekiti between 1978 and 1980. He also captained the University Volleyball team at the University of Lagos where he had his Law Degree Course between 1980 and 1983.

After completing his higher education, he was posted to Yola, Adamawa State for his National Youth service Corps where he started his career as a legal practitioner.

In the year 1984, Jegede,  qualified as a lawyer after the One Year mandatory programme at the Nigeria Law School, Victoria Island, Lagos, Nigeria.

Career 
Being a dynamic and seasoned Lawyer, in the year 1992, he was appointed a Notary Public by the Chief Justice of Nigeria and in the space of less than 10 years was elevated to the rank of Senior Advocate of Nigeria. He was deeply and actively involved in political cases and election petition matters, an area of law where his industry and practice is noted and respected.

He worked in the law firm of Murtala Aminu & Co. Yola. After twelve years practice in the law firm, six years of which he was the Head of Chambers, he established his own law firm, Tayo Jegede & Co in 1996. He was heading his law firm of Tayo Jegede & Co in Abuja and Yola before he took his previous appointment as Chief Law Officer in Ondo State.

In May 2009, the dynamic Governor of Ondo State in his quest for a vibrant, dynamic and very articulate number one law officer of the state, appointed this Legal icon as the Hon. Attorney-General and Commissioner for Justice. Since his appointment as the number one law officer of the state, the Ministry of Justice has witnessed an unprecedented positive change in all ramifications.

Jegede is a former Chancellor of Anglican Communion of Jalingo, Taraba State, he was once the Chancellor of Anglican Dioceses of Yola and a member of Implementation Committee of American University, Yola, Adamawa State, as well as a member, Chairman Board of Governors, ABTI Academy International School and member, Board of Trustees, Elizade University, Ilara-Mokin, Ondo-State.

Political career 
Jegede emerged the winner of his party’s PDP primary by polling 760 votes to defeat the Deputy Governorship Candidate of the PDP in the 2012 governorship election, Hon. Saka Lawal. On November 23, 2016, The Appeal Court pronounced Jegede as the gubernatorial flag bearer of his party, PDP. A position previously assumed by the billionaire and business mogul Jimoh Ibrahim. Jegede emerged the flag bearer of PDP Governorship Primary for Ondo State October 2020 election with a poll of 888 votes, he defeated the Deputy Governor Agboola Ajayi who emerged the second runner-up with 657 votes.

References

Living people
Year of birth missing (living people)
Senior Advocates of Nigeria
University of Lagos alumni
20th-century Nigerian lawyers